David May may refer to:
David May (merchant) (1848–1927), American businessman
David May (computer scientist) (born 1951), British computer scientist
David May (footballer) (born 1970), English footballer
Dave May (1943–2012), baseball player
David N. May, (born 1971), American judge

See also
David Mays (disambiguation)
David Mayer (disambiguation)
David Meyer (disambiguation)